William Lyall (26 March 1953 – 1 December 1989) was a Scottish musician, known for his work with Pilot, The Alan Parsons Project, and the Bay City Rollers.

Born in Edinburgh, Scotland, Lyall was a singer, keyboard player and flautist with Pilot, and co-wrote "Magic", Pilot's 1974 hit single. He moved to London in the early 1970s and lived in a red-brick mansion flat in Fitzjames Avenue, West Kensington.

He contributed to the Alan Parsons Project with fellow Pilot members, and he was an early member of the Bay City Rollers. He was the keyboard player for Dollar between 1978 and 1982.

He left Pilot in early 1976, and he released a solo album, Solo Casting, later that year. In 1979, he contributed string arrangements and synthesizers to an album by the band Runner.

Death
Lyall died in the AIDS pandemic, dying at the age of 36 in 1989. Bay City Rollers' manager Tam Paton later said that Lyall was gay.

References

1953 births
1989 deaths
Scottish keyboardists
20th-century Scottish male singers
Scottish flautists
Musicians from Edinburgh
Bay City Rollers members
Pilot (band) members
AIDS-related deaths in the United Kingdom
Gay singers
Scottish LGBT singers
20th-century Scottish LGBT people
20th-century flautists
Scottish gay musicians